Frank Hoxie "Kid" Willson (November 3, 1895 – April 17, 1964) was a professional baseball player. He played parts of two seasons in Major League Baseball nine years apart, in 1918 and 1927, both for the Chicago White Sox. He was primarily used as a pinch hitter, appearing just twice in the field, once as a left fielder and once as a center fielder, among his eleven major league games.

References

External links 

Major League Baseball outfielders
Chicago White Sox players
Regina Senators players
Hutchinson Wheat Shockers players
Waco Cubs players
Shreveport Sports players
Dallas Steers players
Toledo Mud Hens players
Seattle Indians players
Baseball players from Nebraska
People from Franklin County, Nebraska
1895 births
1964 deaths
Vancouver Beavers players